The women's football tournament at the 1994 Asian Games was held from 3 October to 12 October 1994 in Hiroshima, Japan. This tournament also served as Asian qualification round for 1995 FIFA Women's World Cup with top-2 teams would qualify.

Squads

Results
All times are Japan Standard Time (UTC+09:00)

Preliminary round

Gold medal match

Goalscorers

Final standing

References

 Results

External links
 RSSSF Women

Women